Habash (also Romanized as Ḩabash; also known as Ḩabashī) is a village in Meshgin-e Gharbi Rural District, in the Central District of Meshgin Shahr County, Ardabil Province, Iran. At the 2006 census, its population was 224, in 53 families.

References 

Towns and villages in Meshgin Shahr County